Dr. Denise Murrell is associate curator for 19th and 20th century art at the Metropolitan Museum of Art in New York City.

Early life
Murrell spent her teenage years in Gastonia, North Carolina. At the time, she had aspirations of becoming a history professor.

Education
Murrell earned her M.B.A. from Harvard Business School in 1980. She was one of only 30 black students in her class and one of less than ten women. She eventually took classes in art history at Hunter College and earned a Master's as well as PhD in the subject at Columbia University.

Career
Murrell began taking art history classes in 1999 while working in business and finance at Institutional Investor. After earning a Master's and PhD in the subject, she transitioned into the art history discipline, but had difficulty securing a position. Finally, she gained her first position in the field writing and giving gallery talks at the Metropolitan Museum of Art in New York City. She began specializing in several areas, including African American and diasporan art, Matisse, the School of Paris, Manet, and Impressionism, receiving a $100,000 postdoctoral research fellowship from the Ford Foundation in 2014 to carry out her work. The research led to her first exhibition, staged at the Wallach Art Gallery at Columbia University, called Posing Modernity: The Black Model from Manet and Matisse to Today, which included works such as "Miss LaLa at the Cirque Fernando" by Edgar Degas. The exhibition was then brought to the Musée d’Orsay in Paris, France, exhibited under the title Black Models: From Géricault to Matisse. She authored a companion book to the exhibits, identically titled to Columbia's iteration.

Bibliography
Posing Modernity: The Black Model from Manet and Matisse to Today, Yale University Press (2018)

References

American art curators
American women curators
People associated with the Metropolitan Museum of Art
Columbia University alumni
Harvard Business School alumni
Hunter College alumni
Living people
Year of birth missing (living people)
African-American curators
21st-century African-American people
21st-century African-American women